Sade is a 2000 French film directed by Benoît Jacquot, adapted by Jacques Fieschi and Bernard Minoret from the novel La terreur dans le boudoir by Serge Bramly.

Plot 

Paris in 1794: After prolonged detention, the Marquis de Sade (Daniel Auteuil), who claims during the hearing to be neither noble nor the author of the novel Justine, is incarcerated with other nobles in a prison which was formerly a monastery in Picpus.

Cast 
 Daniel Auteuil – Marquis de Sade 
 Marianne Denicourt – Marie-Constance Quesnet / Sensible
 Jeanne Balibar – Madame Santero
 Grégoire Colin – Fournier
 Isild Le Besco – Emilie de Lancris 
 Jean-Pierre Cassel – Le vicomte de Lancris 
 Sylvie Testud – Renée de Sade
 Philippe Duquesne - Coignard
 François Levantal - Latour

See also
 Quills (film) was an English-language film covering similar subject matter, released the same year.

References

External links
 
 

2000 films
2000s erotic drama films
Films based on French novels
BDSM in films
Films directed by Benoît Jacquot
Films about the Marquis de Sade
French erotic drama films
Films featuring a Best Actor Lumières Award-winning performance
2000s French-language films
2000s French films
Films set in 1794